The men's triple jump at the 2015 World Championships in Athletics was held at the Beijing National Stadium on 26 and 27 August.

The early season meet at Doha gave an indication that this would be an exciting year in the triple jump.  Pedro Pablo Pichardo, who would return here as the previous silver medalist jumped 18.06 to become the #3 jumper in history.  In that same meet, Olympic Champion Christian Taylor was only 2 cm behind to equal the previous #3, who was the defending world champion Teddy Tamgho.  Tamgho was also in Doha, finishing in third behind the fireworks, but Tamgho was coming off a 1-year drug suspension for missing multiple tests.  Following that meet, two weeks later Pichardo improved his world lead to 18.08 at home in Havana and then in early July, Taylor improved to 18.06 and beat Pichardo in Lausanne.  It was destined that the World Championships would settle this battle.  Tamgho did not return to defend the championship in Beijing.

In the qualification round, only Marian Oprea made an automatic qualifier on his first attempt, it took Taylor two and Pichardo three but there was no doubt either would make the final.  In the final Pichardo took the first round lead with 17.52, Taylor made 17.49 on his second attempt and both jumped exactly 17.60 in the third round.  Taylor took the lead in the fourth round with 17.68.  Omar Craddock moved into third place with a 17.37.	
  
It was the final attempt that settled the score.  First Nelson Évora moved into the bronze medal with a 17.52.  Then Taylor launched an 18.21, the second best jump in history only behind the world record of Jonathan Edwards set while winning the World Championship 20 years earlier.	
It was then up to Pichardo to answer and his 17.73 solidified his hold on the silver medal.  Taylor's jump took the 19 year old North American Continental Record and American Record from Kenny Harrison set at the 1996 Olympics, the previous number 2 jumper in history.

Records
Prior to the competition, the records were as follows:

Qualification standards

Schedule

Results

Qualification
Qualification: Qualifying Performance 17.00 (Q) or at least 12 best performers (q) advanced to the final.

Final
The final was started at 19:10.

References

Triple jump
Triple jump at the World Athletics Championships